Trones og Sentrum is a borough of the city of Sandnes in the west part of the large municipality of Sandnes in Rogaland county, Norway. It encompasses the downtown part of the city, at the inner end of the Gandsfjorden. Sandnes Church is located in this borough.

References

Boroughs and neighbourhoods of Sandnes